Bourmond Byron (June 23, 1920 - 2004) was a Haitian painter. Hailing from Jacmel, Byron mainly paints landscapes and scenes from Haitian life.

References

 

1920 births
Haitian painters
Haitian male painters
2004 deaths
People from Jacmel